Philippine adobo (from Spanish adobar: "marinade," "sauce" or "seasoning" /  ) is a popular Filipino dish and cooking process in Philippine cuisine that involves meat, seafood, or vegetables marinated in vinegar, soy sauce, garlic, bay leaves, and black peppercorns, which is browned in oil, and simmered in the marinade. It has occasionally been considered the unofficial national dish in the Philippines.

History
The cooking method for the Philippine adobo is indigenous to the Philippines. The various precolonial peoples of the country often cooked or prepared their food with vinegar and salt to preserve them in the tropical climate. Vinegar, in particular, is one of the most important ingredients in Filipino cuisine, with the main traditional types being coconut, cane, nipa palm, and kaong palm. These are all linked to traditional alcohol fermentation.

There are four main traditional cooking methods using vinegar in the Philippines: kiniláw (raw seafood in vinegar and spices), paksíw (a broth of meat with vinegar and spices), sangkutsá (pre-cooked braising of meat in vinegar and spices), and finally adobo (a stew of vinegar, garlic, salt/soy sauce, and other spices). It is believed that paksíw, sangkutsá, and adobo are all derivations of kiniláw. They are also related to cooking techniques like sinigáng and pinangát na isdâ that also have a sour broth, albeit using fruits like calamansi, tamarind, unripe mangoes, bilimbi, santól, and star fruit as souring agents instead of vinegar.

When the Spanish Empire colonized the Philippines in the late 16th and early 17th centuries, they encountered the adobo cooking process. It was first recorded in the 1613 dictionary Vocabulario de la lengua tagala compiled by the Spanish Franciscan missionary Pedro de San Buenaventura. He referred to it as adobo de los naturales ("adobo of the native [peoples]"). 

The Spanish also applied the term adobo to any native dish that was marinated before consumption. In the 1794 edition of the Vocabulario, it was applied to quilauìn (kinilaw) a related but different dish which also primarily uses vinegar. In the 1711 Visayan dictionary Vocabulario de la lengua Bisaya, the term guinamus (verb form: gamus) was used to refer to any kind of marinades (adobo), from fish to pork. Other terms for precolonial adobo-like dishes among the Visayan peoples are dayok and danglusi. In modern Visayan, guinamós and dayok refer to separate dishes. Dishes prepared with vinegar, garlic, salt (later soy sauce), and other spices eventually came to be known solely as adobo, with the original term for the dish now lost to history.

Description

While the adobo dish and cooking process in Filipino cuisine and the general description of adobo in Spanish cuisine share similar characteristics, they refer to different things with different cultural roots.  Unlike the Spanish and Latin American adobo, the main ingredients of Philippine adobo are ingredients native to Southeast Asia, namely vinegar (made from palm sap or sugarcane), soy sauce (originally salt), black peppercorns, and bay leaves (traditionally Cinnamomum tamala and related species; but in modern times, usually Laurus nobilis). It does not traditionally use chilis, paprika, oregano, or tomatoes. Its only similarity to Spanish and Latin American adobo is the primary use of vinegar and garlic. Philippine adobo has a characteristically salty and sour, and often sweet, taste, in contrast to Spanish and Mexican adobos which are spicier or infused with oregano.

While the Philippine adobo can be considered adobo in the Spanish sense—a marinated dish—the Philippine usage is much more specific to a cooking process (rather than a specific recipe) and is not restricted to meat. Typically, pork or chicken, or a combination of both, is slowly cooked in vinegar, crushed garlic, bay leaves, black peppercorns, and soy sauce. It is served with white rice. It was traditionally cooked in small clay pots (palayok or kulon); but today, metal pots or woks (kawali) are largely used instead.

There are numerous variants of the adobo recipe in the Philippines. The most basic ingredient of adobo is vinegar, which is usually coconut vinegar, rice vinegar, or cane vinegar (although sometimes white wine or cider vinegar can also be used). Almost every ingredient can be changed according to personal preference. Even people in the same household can cook adobo in significantly different ways. 

A rarer version without soy sauce is known as adobong puti ("white adobo"), which uses salt instead, to contrast it with adobong itim ("black adobo"), the more prevalent versions with soy sauce. Adobong puti is often regarded as the closest to the original version of the prehispanic adobo. It is similar to another dish known as pinatisan, where patis (fish sauce) is used instead of vinegar.

Adobong dilaw ("yellow adobo"), which uses kalawag (turmeric) to provide the yellow colouring as well as adding in a different flavour, can be found in Batangas, the Visayas, and Mindanao regions. 

The proportion of ingredients like soy sauce, bay leaves, garlic, or black pepper can vary. The amount and thickness of the sauce also varies as some like their adobo dry while some like it saucy. Other ingredients can sometimes be used; like siling labuyo, bird's eye chili, jalapeño pepper, red bell pepper, olive oil, onions, brown sugar, potatoes, or pineapple. It may also be further browned in the oven, pan-fried, deep-fried, or even grilled to get crisped edges.

Adobo has been called the quintessential Philippine stew, served with rice both at daily meals and at feasts. It is commonly packed for Filipino mountaineers and travelers because it keeps well without refrigeration. Its relatively long shelf-life is due to one of its primary ingredients, vinegar, which inhibits the growth of bacteria.

Variations

Based on the main ingredients, the most common adobo types are adobong manók, in which chicken is used, and adobong baboy, in which pork is used. Adobong baka (beef), along with adobong manók (chicken), is more popular among Muslim Filipinos in accordance with halal dietary laws. Other meats may also be used, such as pugò (quail), itik (duck), and kambíng (goat). Seafood variants include fish (isdâ), catfish (hitò), shrimp (hipon), and squid or cuttlefish (pusít). Vegan options utilize vegetables and fruits, like water spinach (kangkóng), bamboo shoots (labóng), eggplant (talóng), banana flowers (pusô ng saging), and okra (okra). 

More exotic versions include adobong sawâ (snake), adobong palakâ (frog), Kapampangan adobung kamaru (mole cricket), and the adobong atáy at balúnbalunan (chicken liver and gizzard).

There are also regional variations. In Bicol, Quezon, and south in Zamboanga City, it is common for adobo to have coconut milk (known as adobo sa gatâ). In Cavite, mashed pork liver is added. In Batangas and Laguna, turmeric is added, giving the dish a distinct, yellowish color (known as adobong diláw, "yellow adobo"), as well as a red variant using achuete seeds in the former. In the northernmost province of Batanes, the Ivatan prepare a type of adobo called luñiz, where they preserve pork in jars with salt.

Adobo has also become a favorite of Filipino-based fusion cuisine, with avant-garde cooks coming up with variants such as "Japanese-style" pork adobo.

Other uses
Outside of the dish itself, the flavor of adobo has been developed commercially and adapted to other foods.  A number of local Philippine snack products such as cornicks, nuts, chips, noodle soups, and corn crackers, market their items as "adobo flavored".

In popular culture
In 2021, the Bureau of Philippine Standards of the Department of Trade and Industry (DTI-BPS) of the Philippines unveiled plans to standardize the most popular Filipino dishes to make it easier to promote them internationally as well as keep their cultural identity. Philippine adobo will be the first of such dishes to be standardized. The definition will be set by a technical committee headed by Glenda Rosales Barreto, and includes representatives from the academia, government departments, the food industry, chefs, and food writers. The main reference will be Kulinarya: A Guidebook to Philippine Cuisine (2008), authored by Barreto and the committee vice-chairperson Myrna Segismundo, both notable chefs of Filipino cuisine in their own right. The announcement has received some criticism from the public, but the DTI-BPS clarified that it's not mandatory and will only aim to define a basic traditional recipe that can serve as a benchmark for determining the authenticity of Filipino dishes in the international setting.

On March 15, 2023, Google Doodles released a Philippine Adobo doodle.

See also

Related Philippine dishes and cooking techniques:
Humba
Pata tim
Paksiw
Kinilaw
Dinuguan

Ayam kecap - similarly styled dish from Indonesia and Malaysia
Semur (Indonesian stew) - similarly styled dish from Indonesia
Tsukudani - similar cooking technique from Japan

References

External links
 
 

National dishes
Philippine cuisine